Pandi may refer to:

 Pandi, Bulacan, Philippines
 Pandi, Cundinamarca, Colombia
 Pandi (film), a 2008 Indian Tamil-language film
 Pandi (legendary creature), a creature of medieval bestiary
 Pandi (mascot), a symbol of the 2018 Summer Youth Olympics
 Pandi Melam, an Indian classical percussion concert or ensemble
 PANDI, sponsor for the Indonesian internet country code .id

People
Pandi Geço (1913–1994), Albanian geographer
Pandi Gëllçi, Albanian volleyball coach
Pandi Laço (born 1964), Albanian journalist, songwriter, presenter and scenarist
Pandi Raidhi (1931–1999), Albanian actor

See also
Pandey, a surname

Albanian masculine given names